Superman The Ride (formerly known as Bizarro and Superman – Ride of Steel) is a steel roller coaster at Six Flags New England in Agawam, Massachusetts. Built by Swiss manufacturer Intamin, the hypercoaster opened to the public as Superman – Ride of Steel in 2000. In 2009, the park changed the name to Bizarro, named after a DC Comics character portrayed as the antithesis of Superman. In accordance with the theme change, the coaster's track and supports were repainted with a purple and dark blue color scheme, and other special effects were added. In 2016, the Six Flags reverted to the original theme, but instead of restoring the name, it was changed to Superman The Ride. A virtual reality feature was added the same year, which created an optional 3D experience for passengers, but was removed prior to the 2017 season.

Superman The Ride has been well received, consistently holding a high ranking among steel roller coasters in the annual Golden Ticket Awards published by Amusement Today. The ride has topped the list five times since its debut. It has also weathered criticism from two serious accidents that occurred early in its tenure with one resulting in a passenger's death. Several safety modifications were made in their wake.

History
Prior to the 2000 season, Six Flags New England was known as Riverside Park. Six Flags purchased the park and added their own DC Comics theming. The site on which Superman The Ride operates is the former site of the Riverside Park Speedway. The Speedway was closed and demolished after the 1999 season to make room for a new themed area, DC Universe (known as DC Superhero Adventure until 2020). As part of the $40 million expansion, the park built Superman: Ride of Steel. A year before the Speedway's demolition, Six Flags had worked with Swiss manufacturer Intamin to build and design the ride. The final track piece of Superman was installed on March 27, 2000, about 40 days before opening day. The ride officially opened on May 5, 2000 as the tallest and longest roller coaster on the East Coast of the United States. The entrance and station were themed to Superman with Superman logos and a picture of him located above the entrance. The second tunnel also had a mist effect.

2009 theme change
Superman: Ride of Steel was re-themed as Bizarro at the start of the 2009 season. Six Flags had to work with the Zoning Board of Appeals to file a permit for the new effects because the ride sits on the Connecticut River floodplain. Although no changes were made to the track layout, a new theme highlighting Superman's evil clone, Bizarro, was added. The track was repainted purple with dark blue supports, and multiple special effects were added; including building structures that give riders the impression of speeding through a city, rings in the shape of Bizarro's S shield that the train passes through, and flame effects. The two trains were repainted purple with new on-board audio. Six Flags introduced an "alternate reality game" to market the newly themed ride. Bizarro opened on May 22, 2009, at the start of Memorial Day weekend. Since the transformation, some of the effects have been removed. The fire effects were relocated to the New Texas Giant at Six Flags Over Texas.

2016 theme change and VR experience
On September 3, 2015, it was announced that Bizarro's theme would be restored to Superman The Ride for the 2016 season. On March 3, 2016, Six Flags announced that the ride would be one of several rides at various Six Flags parks to feature a VR system. Riders have the option of wearing a Samsung Gear VR headset, powered by Oculus to create a  360-degree, 3D experience while riding. It is themed to Superman saving a city from Lex Luthor's Lex Bots who are causing chaos with an anti-gravity ray. This theming also came to the Superman: Krypton Coaster at Six Flags Fiesta Texas and Superman - Ride of Steel at Six Flags America. Starting July 25, 2016, the Virtual Reality experience was offered during the afternoons. VR was removed for the 2017 season.

Ride experience

Track layout
After departing from the station, the train climbs the -tall chain lift hill. To the left of the lift hill is the Connecticut River, which is parallel to much of the coaster. After reaching the top, the train drops  into a fogged headchopper tunnel. After the train exits the tunnel, it climbs a second hill before dropping down into a 120 degree overbanked turn to the right. Riders then ride through cutouts of buildings and climb the third and fourth major hills. The third hill is where the on-ride photo is taken. After the fourth hill, the train drops through Superman's S shields. Riders crest a small hill, turning right into a clockwise helix, known as the spaghetti bowl. It then jumps over a bunny hill into a counter-clockwise helix. The train makes a right turn drop into a fogged tunnel followed by three bunny hills before banking right into the station.

Trains

The roller coaster features two fiberglass trains with stadium-style seating. Each train has nine cars with two rows of paired seats per car. When the ride was re-themed in 2009, onboard audio was added to the trains. On each one, the two rear seats of the fifth car have speakers mounted in the headrests of the seats that play a soundtrack. This reduced the capacity of the trains from 36 to 34. Upon reopening following the change, a recording of various film quotes played while the train was in motion, ending with a loop of Bizarro and several other people chanting his name. Eventually, the audio track was switched to a compilation of clips from different rock songs, although the ending portion of the audio loop was kept due to popular demand. While on the final brake run waiting to return to the loading station, riders hear Bizarro chanting his name and "Bizarro #1". The new trains paint scheme was changed from blue and red to purple. Each seat originally had an individual hydraulic T-shaped lap bar restraints, but after several safety modifications, the restraints now consist of two metal bars on each side.

Track
The track was originally painted red with blue supports, to fit the theme of Superman. In 2009, after the re-theme to Bizarro, the track was repainted purple while the supports were painted a darker shade of blue. In 2016, the track and supports were repainted to their original colors but using more vibrant shades.

Accidents and incidents

On August 6, 2001, one of the trains failed to stop at the ride's brake run, colliding with the other train in the loading station. 22 people were sent to hospitals, without any major injuries. The ride reopened on August 18, 2001.

On May 1, 2004, a 55-year-old man was thrown from the coaster during the last turn and was killed. An investigation later showed that the ride attendant failed to properly check and secure the rider's seat restraint, as the rider's large girth size was a factor in the T-bar restraint's ability to close. The victim's family claimed that due to his various medical conditions, such as cerebral palsy, he shouldn't have been allowed to ride. The park responded by saying the federal Americans with Disabilities Act forbids them from denying rides to persons with disabilities if the person is able to board without assistance.

Safety modifications
Superman The Ride has undergone numerous safety upgrades. After the 2001 incident, the PVC airlines were replaced with steel reinforced air hoses to prevent a similar accident from occurring. After the 2004 incident, metal bars were installed on both sides of the "T-bar" restraint, encasing the rider's legs. Shin restraints were added to the lower portion of the restraint, preventing riders' feet from leaving the car. In addition, all of the seat belts on both 36-passenger trains were replaced with ones at a consistent length, as well as a "go or no go" belt for each seat and T-bar restraint. The "go or no-go" belt ensured the T-bar restraint was in an effective position before leaving the station. During the 2009 rebranding, new trains were deployed with new restraints added. The new lap bars eliminated the center pole, leaving only the exterior poles. New seat belts provided more strength and were less likely to come undone unintentionally.

Rankings

Superman The Ride, along with Millennium Force, have held the top two spots in the Golden Ticket Awards poll every year from 2001 to 2015. Superman The Ride is praised by the roller coaster community, and the ride is noted for its smoothness and large amount of airtime.

References

External links
Six Flags New England's Official Page for Bizarro
 

Roller coasters operated by Six Flags
Roller coasters manufactured by Intamin
Roller coasters in Massachusetts
Steel roller coasters
Six Flags New England
Superman in amusement parks
Roller coasters introduced in 2000
Roller coasters introduced in 2009
Warner Bros. Global Brands and Experiences attractions